Chang-dong Station is a station on Seoul Subway Line 1 and Line 4. It is located in Chang-dong, Dobong-gu, Seoul.
A shopping center was planned for this site, but the empty lot has never been developed due to the bankruptcy of the contractor behind said project.  The station is, however, home to a cluster of pojangmacha stalls.

History
Chang-dong Station was opened on October 15, 1911 as part of the first segment of the Gyeongwon Line. The Line 4 station opened on April 20, 1985, while Line 1 service was extended northwards from Kwangwoon Univ. to Chang-dong Station on December 22, 1985.

Exits
 Exit 1: Nogok Middle School, Nowon-gu Office, Dobong Police Station, Dobong-gu Office Annex, Sanggye High School, Seoul Wolcheon Elementary School, Eunhyeganho Hagwon, Jawoon Elementary School, Chang 4-dong Community Center, Chang 4-dong Protection Center, Hi Mart Chang-dong, Jawoon High School, Donga Cheongsol Apartment House
 Exit 2: Dobong-gu Office, Dobong Registry Office, Donga Green Apartment House, Seoul Bukbu District Office of Education, E-Mart Chang-dong, Chang 4-dong Catholic Church, Seoul Changdong Elementary School

Gallery

References 

Seoul Metropolitan Subway stations
Railway stations opened in 1911
Metro stations in Dobong District
1911 establishments in Korea